Simply in Love may refer to:

Simply in Love (Tony Christie album), 2006 album by Tony Christie
"Simply in Love", a song by Carroll Thompson that topped the reggae chart in 1981